Mohammad Anwar Hossain (born December 10, 1983) is a Bangladeshi cricketer who played in one Test and one ODI in 2002.

References

1983 births
Living people
Bangladesh Test cricketers
Bangladesh One Day International cricketers
Bangladeshi cricketers
Dhaka Division cricketers
Dhaka Metropolis cricketers
Wicket-keepers
Cricketers from Dhaka